Albino Farm is a 2009 horror film written and directed by Joe Anderson and Sean McEwen. It stars Chris Jericho, Richard Christy, Tammin Sursok, and Alex Neustaedter.

Plot
In the small town of Shiloh, two boys on bicycles ride through the woods up to the gates of the legendary Albino Farm. The oldest goes in and the youngest stays outside. The oldest boasts he isn't scared of anything, and then a figure leaps out and drags him into the woods.

The film cuts to Stacey, Melody, Brian, and Sanjay driving down a forest road, working on a history research project about backwoods American customs and legends. They almost hit someone, whom they initially take to be a young boy, scraping roadkill off the asphalt. To their sudden fright, the "child" turns out to be a dwarf who turns his head, with an unsettling countenance.

When they walk back to their SUV, they see they have a flat tire. They keep driving until they see a gas station with the local man Jeremiah out front, who is blind. They talk to him and he talks eccentrically and incoherently, with a biblical turn. They acquire a tire to replace the flat one; Brian, the jerk of the group, deliberately underpays Jeremiah.

The students continue their trip and stop at a white tent pitched in a field. Melody and Brian head up to investigate and are greeted by another local with a harelip who tells them about the Albino Farm and alludes that it may be a legend. There's a revival meeting in the tent, and the harelipped man strongly suggest that they receive salvation. The foursome keeps driving until they reach the old-fashioned town of Shiloh. They stop at a diner and eat, as night falls. They're served by a friendly, buxom waitress whom Brian and Sanjay knock themselves out over until they note that she has deformed hands, with clawlike fingers. Brian and Melody go looking for the Albino Farm while Sanjay and Stacey talk to an old woman inside an old church who suspiciously and unconvincingly tells them there is no such thing as the Albino Farm. Retreating to a back room, Stacey and Sanjay enter to see the woman breastfeeding a hideously deformed baby.

Meanwhile, Melody and Brian ask a small boy, who communicates via chalkboard, where the Albino Farm is. He tells them to ask a group of unruly and somewhat disgusting teens in a car. There they meet Levi and his two deaf friends, who agree to take them to the Albino Farm for twenty-five dollars and a view of Melody's breasts. After a minor argument, Melody reluctantly agrees, and they head off to the Albino Farm. The teens drive crazily, causing Melody to vomit. They stop in front of the gates to the farm and get into an argument. A fight between Levi and Brian breaks out and the teens drive away after flipping them off. Brian and Melody enter an old house and Brian sees a person and chases after them, with Melody following. Brian gets his leg caught in a bear trap.

Sanjay and Stacey go looking for their friends and ask the same boy for directions. After driving to the farm with the boy as a guide, who bikes away after they arrive. They find a hysterical Melody, and she leads them to where she had last saw Brian, but he is gone. He had been captured and brought to a house inhabited by strange, horribly deformed people—one with a tongue protruding from a rosebud mouth, one with a pinhead, and several of them pig-like. The "Pig Bitch" reveals her cleavage and does a striptease for Brian, who rejects her. She then takes a meat hook and shoves it through Brian's mouth and cheek.

Melody, Sanjay, and Stacey, after hearing their car alarm, run back to their car to see that it has been oddly vandalized. Sanjay's camera, luckily, catches the perpetrator, who had also taken their luggage. The three go searching for Brian and find their luggage in a clearing, along with other people's. They then see a tree hung with skulls and bones. Going ballistic, Melody runs back through the woods, only to get attacked by the deformed pig people and have her neck snapped.

Stacey and Sanjay find a dilapidated shack and enter cautiously. They see Brian in a chair with his back to them and approach him quietly, only to realize that he's dead. The pig people arrive at the shack and barricade the door. One of them breaks through the wall, but Sanjay hits him in the arm with an axe. The shack catches fire; Stacey and Sanjay flee into the woods. They discover Melody hanging upside down in the bone tree. They run, and the crazed, deformed clan chases them. They hide behind a tree, letting the killers pass without seeing them, but the killers wind up finding them and force them to continue running. They soon bump into the Pig Bitch, who knocks them out and captures them.

They wake up in a cave and find their arms sewn together. They hobble away and stumble upon the pig people's cave campsite. One sees them, and the pair race away. They light a torch and try to rip their arms apart. They gorily succeed. They try to escape, but are attacked by the Pig Bitch. Stacey jabs the torch into her face, forcing her to let go, and they get away. Sanjay ends up falling into a chasm. Stacey climbs down into the chasm and consoles, him and then turns on some propane tanks when Pig Bitch attacks Stacey with a meat hook. Stacey and Pig Bitch fight.

The rest of the monsters arrive, and Sanjay comes to and reaches for the torch. Pig Bitch and Stacey choke each other, and Stacey rips out some of Pig Bitch's hair. Stacey then picks up the meat hook and slashes Pig Bitch's throat before repeatedly stabbing her with the hook. Sanjay then heroically lights the torch, killing himself and a good number of the deformed people, and Stacey runs out of the cave as an explosion ensues, knocking her out.

Stacey wakes up as dawn breaks and runs into the woods before reaching a field. She drops the meat hook as she comes upon the same white tent where a church congregation is meeting. She hysterically runs in and tries to explain what has happened. The preacher, who takes off his sunglasses and reveals abnormally light (albino) eyes, laughs with the rest of the congregation. The congregation is composed of people who are deformed as well—not as horribly as the Albino Farm residents, but in the unsettling way of a freak show—Siamese twin sisters, another suckling deformed baby, a man with a stretched-out smile, another with a fat, pasty face, and the dwarf encountered earlier. As Stacey cries, "My God, its the whole town!" the preacher quotes the passage about the sins of the fathers visiting the children. The audience, visibly amused, sings on, with Stacey, who by now is completely over the edge, grins widely and manically.

Cast 
 Tammin Sursok as Stacey
 Chris Jericho as Levi
 Richard Christy as Caleb
 Duane Whitaker as Jeremiah
 Alex Neustaedter as Samuel
 Sunkrish Bala	as Sanjay
 Nick Richey as Brian
 Alicia Lagano as Melody
 Kevin Spirtas as Preacher
 Christopher Michael White as Jacob
 Bianca Barnett as Pig Bitch
 Paul Ford as Old Dwarf
 Shelby Janes as Shelby
 Joicie Appell as Ruth
 Jackson Curtis as Mute Boy
 Troy Dunkle as Pin Head
 Ryan Shields as Big Eye
 Mike Strain Jr. as Smash Face
 Barry Curtis as Split Lip
 Beth Graveman as Bird Girl

Production 

Albino Farm was shot in Marionville, Missouri. It was also filmed in nearby Warrensburg and just outside Willard.
The film is loosely based on a legend about college students exploring to the Ozark Mountains, who never came back from the Springlawn Farm.

Make-up and special effects
The costumes and make-up were created by special effects and makeup artist Jason Barnett.

Release 
The film was released by MTI Home Video on September 22, 2009 with a time from 90 minutes, the German FSK 18 DVD runs 85 minutes.

Reception

Dread Central panned the film, awarding it a score of 1 1/2 out of 5, writing "Albino Farm can be summed up in one word: “unremarkable”. An unremarkable script, unremarkable score, unremarkable cinematography, unremarkable (and even occasionally downright poor) editing and direction, and a swimming-through-treacle first two acts all conspire to remove any possibility of a recommendation. Once the violence kicks off it's relatively entertaining, but I wouldn't blame you if you can't make it that far".
Kurt Dahlke from DVD Talk gave the film a negative review, complimenting the film's make-up but criticized the film's lack of originality, and overuse of teen horror clichés.

References

External links
 
 
 
 

2009 films
2009 independent films
Films about cannibalism
Films set in Missouri
2009 horror films
Horror films based on actual events
American independent films
American slasher films
2000s English-language films
2000s American films
2000s slasher films